Wild Animals I Have Known is an 1898 book by naturalist and author Ernest Thompson Seton.  The first entry in a new genre of realistic wild-animal fiction, Seton's first collection of short stories quickly became one of the most popular books of its day. "Lobo the King of Currumpaw", the first story in the collection, was based upon Seton's experience hunting wolves in the southwestern United States.  It became a classic, setting the tone for his future works that would similarly depict animals—especially predators who were often demonized in literature—as compassionate, individualistic beings.

Several years after its publication, Seton and his works came under fire during the nature fakers controversy, which began in 1903 when naturalist John Burroughs published an essay called "Real and Sham Natural History" in The Atlantic Monthly.   In particular Burroughs blamed Seton's collection of stories for founding the sentimental animal story genre, which he felt featured fabricated events and wild animal behaviors; he even amended the title of the collection to Wild Animals I Alone Have Known.

References

External links
 
 Seton Legacy Project Academy for the Love of Learning
 

Ernest Thompson Seton
1898 short story collections
American short story collections
Animals in popular culture
Canadian short story collections
Natural history books
New Canadian Library